Mirat Sarsembayev (born July 13, 1986) is a Kazakh former professional boxer who competed from 2009 to 2010. As an amateur, Sarsembayev won a bronze medal at the 2005 World Amateur Boxing Championships and represented Kazakhstan at the 2008 Olympics as a flyweight.

Career
At the 2005 World Championships he beat Don Broadhurst and Walid Cherif but lost the semifinal to Cuban southpaw Andry Laffita. He was a member of the Kazakhstan national team that competed at the 2005 Boxing World Cup in Moscow, Russia.

At the 2006 Asian Games he lost the quarterfinal to Somjit Jongjohor (11:20), and at the 2007 World Championships he lost to the same opponent (8:17).

At the 2008 Olympics he beat Rafał Kaczor of Poland (14:5) but lost to Russian Georgy Balakshin (4:12).

Professional boxing record

External links

2005 results

Living people
1986 births
Boxers at the 2008 Summer Olympics
Olympic boxers of Kazakhstan
Boxers at the 2006 Asian Games
Kazakhstani male boxers
AIBA World Boxing Championships medalists
Asian Games competitors for Kazakhstan
People from Taldykorgan
Flyweight boxers
21st-century Kazakhstani people